State Route 126 (SR 126) is a  state highway that travels through Sullivan County in East Tennessee. It connects Kingsport and Bristol.

Route description

SR 126 begins in Kingsport at an intersection with SR 93 at its interchange with I-26/US 23 (Exit 4). It goes northeast as a 4-lane undivided highway (known as Wilcox Drive) and immediately has an intersection with its business route, SR 126 Bus (old Wilcox Drive), before going through neighborhoods and industrialized areas before having an interchange with Jared Drive and crossing a bridge over the South Fork Holston River and having an intersection with SR 355. SR 126 continues northeast through more neighborhoods before coming to an intersection with and becoming concurrent with SR 36 (E Center Street), where SR 126 turns southeast to become concurrent with that highway. SR 36/SR 126 then continue southeast to a y-intersection, where they turn onto Fort Henry Drive and become a divided highway. They then come to an intersection with Memorial Boulevard, where SR 126 turns east to leave SR 36 to follow that street. SR 126 becomes undivided once again as it passes through some commercial areas before coming to an interchange with SR 93, where it narrows to 2-lanes and leaves Kingsport, through it still officially remains within the city limits. SR 126 then passes through rural areas and crosses over a ridge before coming to an interchange with I-81 (Exit 66), where it officially exits the city limits of Kingsport. The highway then passes through rural areas again, now paralleling I-81, to enter Blountville, where it has an intersection with SR 75. SR 126 then enters downtown and has an intersection with SR 394. The highway then continues east through downtown before leaving Blountville and continuing east. SR 126 then passes through Walnut Hill before entering Bristol, coming to an end at an intersection with US 11W/SR 1 just south of downtown.

History

SR 126 was the original US 11W from Bristol to Kingsport until the late 1950s when the US highway was relocated 4 miles north of Blountville and paralleled Reedy Creek Road/Bloomington Pike Road, which bypassed Blountville and Sullivan Gardens. SR 126 being the older road also accessed a county road leading to Warrior's Path State Park.

Future

The part known as Memorial Boulevard from Kingsport to Blountville is undergoing an widening project that will add more lanes and make the road safer for traffic. The project has not yet been started.

Junction list

Kingsport business route
A business route of SR 126 exists in Kingsport. It begins at Interstate 26/U.S. Route 23/State Route 93 and ends at SR 126 near downtown Kingsport.

See also

References

External links
 Memorial Boulevard project – Tennessee Department of Transportation

126
Transportation in Sullivan County, Tennessee